Jason and Medea is an oil painting in the Pre-Raphaelite style created by John William Waterhouse in 1907.

The painting depicts the Colchian princess, Medea, preparing a magic potion for Jason to enable him to complete the tasks set for him by her father, Aeëtes.

Medea's determined facial expression shows a characterization consistent with that of Greek literature, particularly Euripides' tragedy Medea.

The painting is thematically and visually similar to Waterhouse's The Magic Circle.

1907 paintings
Paintings by John William Waterhouse
Paintings depicting Greek myths
Witches in art
Works based on Medea (Euripides play)
Cultural depictions of Jason
Oil paintings